Stevensia is a genus of flowering plants belonging to the family Rubiaceae.

It is native to the Dominican Republic and Haiti on the island of Hispaniola.

The genus name of Stevensia is in honour of Edward Stevens (1755–1834), an American physician and diplomat. 
It was first described and published in Bull. Sci. Soc. Philom. Paris Vol.3 on page 137 in 1802.

Known species
According to Kew:
Stevensia aculeolata 
Stevensia buxifolia 
Stevensia ebracteata 
Stevensia ekmaniana 
Stevensia farinosa 
Stevensia grandiflora 
Stevensia hotteana 
Stevensia minutifolia 
Stevensia ovatifolia 
Stevensia samanensis 
Stevensia trilobata

References

Rubiaceae
Rubiaceae genera
Plants described in 1802
Flora of the Dominican Republic
Flora of Haiti